Eagles Meadow is a medium-sized shopping centre in Wrexham city centre. Previously this area has had a variety of uses over hundreds of years, originally used as stables for local gentry, and later a car park hosting a market.  It was developed as a shopping centre in 2008, opening on Thursday 30 October 2008 at 10am.

There is a webcam pointed at the Eagles Meadow bridge hosted by local hyperlocal site Wrexham.com.

History 

Used as local gentry's stables.

During World War II, the area was used as a motorpool for elements of the U.S. Army's 83rd Infantry Division.

After the US Army withdrew its forces in Europe after the war, the buildings and treated surface they had created were ideal as a Horse Repository.

In the early 1970s the land was divided between a large urban car park and a small retail development which included a new Asda superstore. A bridge, known locally as the Asda fly-over, was constructed to carry the then town's ring road between Smithfield Road and Salop Road. After these developments, the car park was used as the main weekly market in the town, which moved from St George's Crescent (the original 'Beast Market').

Asda moved to a larger site in September 2000 and the weekly market eventually moved to a new location at the Waterworld car park.

A number of proposals were put forward for re-development of this land (which is close to St. Giles Church). Firstly John Lewis signed up to anchor a retail based development, which included a number of other stores and a supermarket. This development fell through, and the landowner and largest stakeholder Wrexham County Borough Council decided to put the land up for sale by tender.

A large number of tenders were received and in 2003 the winner was chosen as Wilson Bowden in partnership with architects Bernard Engle. The >£100m development includes two large department stores, cafes, bars, restaurants and over 40 other stores. It includes a number of landmark buildings and urban plazas, including a 'Spanish Steps' style area (see Gallery). A number of high rise city style apartments were constructed on the town centre side of the development. Construction began in early 2006 and opened to the public on 30 October 2008.

Controversy surrounded the new build, as several shops already located in the city centre moved to Eagles Meadow and closed their shops in the city centre. However, by 2021, this trend partially reversed, with numerous outlets moving back to larger units in the city centre, notably Sports Direct moving to the Henblas Street redevelopment in the city centre, and chains with multiple sites in Wrexham such as Greggs and Burger King closing their on-site stores whilst maintaining their city centre sites. The centre has since suffered from store closures from 2016 with many citing high business rates (set by the Welsh Government, Wales-wide), increasing in 2020 due to the COVID-19 pandemic in Wales which saw the closure of one of the centre's anchor stores, Debenhams in 2021.

Stores and amenities
Stores and other amenities at the centre include: Boots, Clarks, Clintons, Clogau, F. Hinds, JD Sports, Next, Odeon Cinema, Marks & Spencer (Closing in late 2023), Pandora, River Island, Tenpin, Trespass and The Entertainer.

Since 2022, the Centre also hosts the monthly Wrexham Clothing Exchange.

Gallery

References

External links
 Eagles Meadow Webcam
 Eagles Meadow official site

Wrexham
Shopping centres in Wales
Shopping malls established in 2008
Buildings and structures in Wrexham County Borough